Robert Staten (born January 23, 1969) is a former American football running back. He played for the Tampa Bay Buccaneers in 1996.

References

1969 births
Living people
People from Clarke County, Mississippi
Players of American football from Mississippi
American football running backs
Jackson State Tigers football players
Tampa Bay Buccaneers players